The 14163 / 64 Prayagraj Junction–Meerut City Sangam Express is an Express train belonging to Indian Railways – North Central Railway zone that runs between Prayagraj Junction &  in India.

It operates as train number 14163 from Prayagraj Junction to Meerut City and as train number 14164 in the reverse direction, serving the state of Uttar Pradesh.

Coaches

The 14163 / 64 Prayagraj Junction–Meerut City Sangam Express has 1 AC 2 tier, 1 AC 3 tier, 4 Sleeper Class, 4 General Unreserved & 1 SLR (Seating cum Luggage Rake) coaches. It does not carry a pantry car.

As is customary with most train services in India, coach composition may be amended at the discretion of Indian Railways depending on demand.

Service

The 14163 Prayagraj Junction–Meerut City Sangam Express covers the distance of 639 kilometres in 12 hours 55 mins (49.47 km/hr) & in 13 hours 10 mins as 14164 Meerut City–Prayagraj Junction Sangam Express (48.53 km/hr).

As the average speed of the train is below , as per Indian Railways rules, its fare does not include a superfast surcharge.

Routeing

Traction

Prior October 2014, due to the route not being fully electrified, a Kanpur-based WAP4 hauls the train from Prayagraj Junction to  handing over to a Tughlakabad-based WDM-3A which powers the train for the remainder of the journey.

With progressive electrification of the route, it is now powered by a Kanpur-based WAP-4 for its entire journey.

Timings

14163 Prayagraj Junction–Meerut City Sangam Express leaves Prayagraj Junction on a daily basis at 17:45 hrs IST and reaches Meerut City at 06:40 hrs IST the next day.

14164 Meerut City–Prayagraj Junction Sangam Express leaves Meerut Cit} on a daily basis at 19:00 hrs IST and reaches Prayagraj Junction at 08:10 hrs IST the next day.

References 

 http://www.news18.com/news/uttar-pradesh/4-grp-personnel-hide-in-sangam-express-trains-toilet-as-robbers-loot-kill-passengers-413959.html
 https://www.youtube.com/watch?v=0wgVuqhcdeo
 https://www.flickr.com/photos/50628848@N07/6173261286/
 http://www.bhaskar.com/article/UP-KAN-three-robbers-arrested-sangam-express-robbery-latest-hindi-news-4629272-PHO.html

External links

Trains from Allahabad
Transport in Meerut
Railway services introduced in 1976
Named passenger trains of India
Express trains in India
Rail transport in Uttar Pradesh